Padang Matsirat is a mukim in Langkawi, Kedah, Malaysia. It is situated on the western part of the island.

Transportation
 Langkawi International Airport

Langkawi
Mukims of Kedah